Pedro Arango López (1902 – death unknown) was a Cuban third baseman in the Negro leagues in the 1920s and 1930s. 

A native of Havana, Cuba, Arango made his Negro leagues debut in 1925 with the Cuban Stars (West). He played for the club again the following season, then played for the Cuban Stars (East) and New York Cubans.

References

External links
 and Baseball-Reference Black Baseball Stats and  Seamheads 

1902 births
Date of birth missing
Place of death missing
Year of death missing
Cuban Stars (East) players
Cuban Stars (West) players
New York Cubans players
Baseball infielders
Cuban expatriate baseball players in the United States
Baseball players from Havana